Foekje Dillema (18 September 19265 December 2007) was a Dutch track and field athlete.

Biography
Dillema was named "athlete of the match" in 1949 after winning the 100 metres and 200 metres race during a tournament in London. She was an important rival for another Dutch athlete Fanny Blankers-Koen, who won four gold medals during the 1948 Summer Olympics and who was voted "Female Athlete of the Century" by the International Association of Athletics Federations (IAAF) in 1999.

In 1950 Dillema was banned from competition for life by the IAAF. Dillema had refused to go to a mandatory sex test for the European championships in Brussels in August 1950. Dillema was the first subject of a mandatory gender verification. The IAAF introduced mandatory sex verification in 1950 and continued this practice until 1992. Dillema's national record of 24.1 seconds for the 200 metres was erased.

On 13 July 1950, Dillema was stopped on her way to an international meeting in France by the Dutch athletics authorities and expelled for life from competition. She returned home to Friesland and did not leave her house for at least one year. She lived a quiet life in her home town afterwards and always refused to speak on the subject.

Dillema, having the typical female phenotype, was designated female at birth, raised as a girl and lived her life as a woman. After her death a forensic test on body cells obtained from her clothing showed signs of a Y-chromosome in her DNA. She may have been a genetic mosaic, having cells with either 46,XX (female) or 46,XY (male) chromosomes, in approximately a one-to-one ratio, in her skin. The forensic report speculated that Dillema developed from a zygote with an XXY genotype that promptly divided into a half XX, half XY embryo through nondisjunction. Dillema was probably a 46XX/46XY woman. This is also known as ovotesticular disorder of sex development (DSD) or true hermaphroditism.

Her biographer Max Dohle concludes that Dillema, having a Y-chromosome, would never have been allowed to race in the last 45 years. The Barr body test (1966) as well as the test based on PCR (1992) scan for a Y-chromosome or an SRY-gene on the Y-chromosome. All female athletes with a Y-chromosome were expelled from competition from 1966 until 2011. At the end of the century, renowned institutions worldwide protested against the viewpoint of the International Olympic Committee (IOC), causing the mandatory gender test based on the Y chromosome to be abandoned. In case of doubt, an athlete with a hyperandrogenic syndrome can still be tested, by a multidisciplinary medical team, during a large tournament like the Olympic Games. The IAAF and the IOC test testosterone levels since May 2011. An athlete with hyperandrogenism not having CAIS will not be allowed to compete without suitable medical treatment.

Dohle concludes that Dillema was an intersex individual who had ovotesticular DSD. She had an operation on her glands in 1952. During the operation, testes or ovotestes were removed. The SRY-gene on the Y is the testis determining factor, so Dillema may have had infertile testes or ovotestes palpable in her groin. These ovotestes produce more testosterone than ovaries. Higher testosterone levels were considered unfair towards the competition, despite being an entirely natural feature of Dillema's physiology.

See also
 Gender verification in sports

References

Bibliography
 Katrina Karkazis, Rebecca Jordan-Young, Georgiann Davis and Silvia Caporesi. Out of Bounds? A Critique of the New Policies on Hyperandrogenism in Elite Female Athletes. The American Journal of Bioethics, 12(7): 3–16, 2012
Dohle, M. (2008) Het verwoeste leven van Foekje Dillema: de grootste tragedie uit de Nederlandse sportgeschiedenis, Arbeiderspers, 
 Andere Tijden Sport – Het mysterie Foekje Dillema. NOS Dutch broadcast 2008

External links

 Het kneuterige Nederland van Ben van Meerendonk
 English information
 Foekje Dillema tribute

1926 births
2007 deaths
Dutch female sprinters
Sex verification in sports
Sportspeople from Friesland
People from Kollumerland
Intersex sportspeople
Intersex women
Dutch LGBT sportspeople
LGBT track and field athletes
Sportspeople banned for life
Sports controversies
Sports scandals in the Netherlands
20th-century Dutch LGBT people